Franconia Township is a township in Montgomery County, Pennsylvania, United States. The population was 13,064 at the 2010 census.

History

Franconia Township was founded in the late 1720s.  The name means "Land Of The Franks", and most of the settlers were Germans seeking religious freedom.

The Bridge in Franconia Township was listed on the National Register of Historic Places in 1988.

Geography
It is in the Delaware watershed and is drained by the East Branch Perkiomen Creek and the West Branch Neshaminy Creek. The township's villages include Earlington, Franconia, Morwood and Reliance. Route 113 crosses it from northeast to southwest and its other major road is north-to-south Allentown Road.

Neighboring municipalities
Hatfield Township (southeast)
Towamencin Township (south)
Lower Salford Township (southwest)
Upper Salford Township (west)
Salford Township (northwest)
West Rockhill Township, Bucks County (north)
Telford (northeast)
Souderton (northeast)
Hilltown Township, Bucks County (east)

Demographics

As of the 2010 census, the township was 93.2% White, 1.6% Black or African American, 0.2% Native American, 3.3% Asian, and 1.2% were two or more races. 1.8% of the population were of Hispanic or Latino ancestry.

At the 2000 census there were 11,523 people, 4,151 households, and 3,300 families living in the township.  The population density was 833.1 people per square mile (321.7/km2).  There were 4,236 housing units at an average density of 306.2/sq mi (118.3/km2).  The racial makeup of the township was 96.57% White, 0.86% African American, 0.08% Native American, 1.71% Asian, 0.01% Pacific Islander, 0.30% from other races, and 0.47% from two or more races. Hispanic or Latino of any race were 0.89%.

There were 4,151 households, 35.1% had children under the age of 18 living with them, 72.2% were married couples living together, 5.3% had a female householder with no husband present, and 20.5% were non-families. 18.0% of households were made up of individuals, and 11.6% were one person aged 65 or older.  The average household size was 2.70 and the average family size was 3.07.

The age distribution was 25.2% under the age of 18, 5.0% from 18 to 24, 28.8% from 25 to 44, 21.4% from 45 to 64, and 19.6% 65 or older.  The median age was 40 years. For every 100 females there were 90.6 males.  For every 100 females age 18 and over, there were 86.0 males.

The median household income was $62,126 and the median family income  was $67,209. Males had a median income of $49,952 versus $32,925 for females. The per capita income for the township was $25,751.  About 1.4% of families and 3.1% of the population were below the poverty line, including 3.3% of those under age 18 and 6.9% of those age 65 or over.

Transportation

Interstate 476 is the most prominent highway traversing Franconia, following the Pennsylvania Turnpike Northeast Extension along a northwest-southeast alignment across the western and southwestern portion of the township. However, the nearest interchange is south of Franconia in Towamencin Township. Pennsylvania Route 113 is the other numbered highway traversing the township, following a northeast-southwest alignment across northern and western portions of Franconia along Harleysville Pike.

The northeastern edge of Franconia Township near Souderton is served by SEPTA bus Route 132, which runs between the Montgomery Mall and Telford.

Politics and government

The township is part of Pennsylvania's 53rd Representative District, represented by Rep. Steve Malagari since 2019.

References

External links
 
 

Townships in Montgomery County, Pennsylvania